The Talampaya Formation is an Early Triassic (Olenekian) geologic formation in the Ischigualasto-Villa Unión Basin of La Rioja Province in northwestern Argentina. The pink to red sandstones of the formation represent the oldest sedimentary unit in the basin, overlying basement rock and were deposited in a high-energy braided river environment. Ichnofossils, probably left by an archosaur chirotherian, were found in the formation. The formation crops out in the Talampaya National Park, which was designated a UNESCO World Heritage Site in 2000.

Description 
The formation was first defined by Romer and Jensen in 1966, based on a type section exposed in the Talampaya River canyon. The Talampaya Formation belongs to the Paganzo Group.

The formation represents the oldest sedimentary unit in the Ischigualasto-Villa Unión Basin in the Talampaya National Park of La Rioja Province, overlying Paleozoic basement, formed by the Tuminico Formation. The Talampaya Formation is overlain by the arid fluvial sandstones and conglomerates of the Tarjados Formation, eroding the Talampaya Formation.

The sediments were deposited under uniform climatic conditions with temperate to warm temperatures and high humidity. Other facies recognized in the formation are alluvial fan deposits with thin tuffaceous beds and conglomerates, covered by a section of basaltis and other volcanic agglomerates and eolian sandstones.

Tetrapod ichnofossils, probably belonging to a chirotherian (and possibly an archosaur), were discovered in the formation southeast of Pagancillo by Argentina paleontologist José Bonaparte in 1964.

See also 
 Sanga do Cabral Formation, contemporaneous fossiliferous formation of the Paraná Basin in southeastern Brazil
 Katberg Formation, contemporaneous fossiliferous formation of the Karoo Basin in South Africa
 Fremouw Formation, contemporaneous fossiliferous formation of Antarctica

References

Bibliography

Further reading 

 

Geologic formations of Argentina
Triassic System of South America
Triassic Argentina
Olenekian Stage
Sandstone formations
Conglomerate formations
Aeolian deposits
Alluvial deposits
Fluvial deposits
Ichnofossiliferous formations
Ischigualasto-Villa Unión Basin
Fossiliferous stratigraphic units of South America
Paleontology in Argentina
Geology of La Rioja Province, Argentina